Stephen Ronald Craig Hicks (born August 19, 1960) is a Canadian-American philosopher. He teaches at Rockford University, where he also directs the Center for Ethics and Entrepreneurship.

Career 
Hicks earned his Bachelor of Arts (Honours, 1981) and Master of Arts degrees from the University of Guelph, and his Doctor of Philosophy (1991) from Indiana University Bloomington. His doctoral thesis was a defense of foundationalism.

Hicks is the author of six books and a documentary. Explaining Postmodernism: Skepticism and Socialism from Rousseau to Foucault (Scholargy, 2004) argues that postmodernism is best understood as a rhetorical strategy of the academic left developed in reaction to the failure of anarchism, socialism, communism. and liberalism.

Additionally, Hicks has published articles and essays on a range of subjects, including entrepreneurism, free speech in academia, the history and development of modern art, Ayn Rand's Objectivism, business ethics and the philosophy of education, including a series of YouTube lectures.

Hicks is also the co-editor, with David Kelley, of a critical thinking textbook, The Art of Reasoning: Readings for Logical Analysis (W. W. Norton & Co., second edition, 1998), Entrepreneurial Living with Jennifer Harrolle (CEEF, 2016), Liberalism Pro and Con (Connor Court, 2020), Art: Modern, Postmodern, and Beyond (with Michael Newberry, 2021) and Eight Philosophies of Education (with Andrew C. Colgan, forthcoming, 2023).

Nietzsche and the Nazis
Hicks' is best known for his documentary and book, Nietzsche and the Nazis, which is an examination of the ideological and philosophical roots of Nazism, particularly how Friedrich Nietzsche's ideas were used and misused by Adolf Hitler and the Nazis to justify their beliefs and practices. This was released in 2006 as a video documentary and then in 2010 as a book.

Criticism 
Hicks's book Explaining Postmodernism was criticised by Matt McManus (lecturer in Sociology at the University of Calgary and the author of The Rise of Post-Modern Conservatism and A Critical Legal Examination of Liberalism and Liberal Rights amongst other books) as misrepresenting much of Western philosophy and being "full of misreadings, suppositions, rhetorical hyperbole and even flat out factual errors." McManus also says,  

(The full quotation from Lyotard and Hicks's gloss on it can be read here).

Public Debates 
In Buenos Aires, Argentina, Hicks teamed with Antonella Mary and Axel Kaiser to debate three Marxist professors:
In Brisbane, Australia, Hicks debated democratic socialist professor John Quiggin:
In New York City, USA, Hicks debated libertarian professor Thaddeus Russell:
In the Defy Media forum, Hicks debated Catholic conservative intellectual John C. Wright:

Publications 
 Nietzsche and the Nazis (Ockham's Razor, 2010)
 Free Speech & Postmodernism (Ockham's Razor, 2010)
 Ayn Rand and Contemporary Business Ethics (Ockham's Razor, 2010)
 Defending Shylock: Productive Work in Financial Markets (Ockham's Razor, 2011)
 What Business Ethics Can Learn From Entrepreneurship (Ockham's Razor, 2011)
 Explaining Postmodernism: Skepticism and Socialism from Rousseau to Foucault (Ockham's Razor, 2013)
 Entrepreneurial Living: 15 Stories of Innovation, Risk, and Achievement and One Story of Abject Failure (CEE Foundation, 2017)
 More Entrepreneurial Living: 16 More Stories of Innovation, Risk, and Achievement (CEE Foundation, 2017)
 Pocket Guide to Postmodernism (The Atlas Society, 2020)
 Pocket Guide to Philosophies of Education (The Atlas Society, 2021)

References

External links
The Center for Ethics and Entrepreneurship's site

1960 births
Living people
American philosophers
American anti-communists
Canadian philosophers
Canadian anti-communists
Critics of postmodernism
Indiana University alumni
Objectivists
Activists from Toronto
Rockford University faculty
University of Guelph alumni
Free speech activists
Objectivism scholars
Anti-anarchism in the United States
Nietzsche scholars
Historians of Nazism